Bruno Grandi (9 May 1934 – 13 September 2019) was an Italian sportsman who served as president of the FIG (Federation Internationale de Gymnastique) from 1996 to 2016 and was a member of the International Olympic Committee from 2000 to 2004. He was also an Italian junior gymnast, but achieved more gymnastics success in a non-performing capacity, rising to become president of the FIG.

Biography
A native of Forlì, Emilia Romagna, Grandi served as Professor of Physical education at the High Institute of Physical Education in Rome. He was a member of the Italian Artistic Gymnastic Juniors team, national coach of the Italian Men's junior's team and the long-time President of the Italian Gymnastics Federation (1977-2000). He pioneered the use of the 6-3-3 system in team finals which is intended to expand the number of countries who can win medals by making it possible to succeed with a smaller pool of gymnasts.

Perhaps as a consequence of this, more nations have achieved gymnastics success during his tenure than did before. They tend to win medals in individual finals rather than team events (in women's gymnastics, only twice in the past 15 years has a world team medal been won by any nation other than Romania, Russia, China and the US, and never an Olympic team medal). In comparison, since 2000 the sport has seen female world and Olympic individual champions from the likes of France, Spain, Brazil, Italy, Great Britain, Australia, North Korea, and the Netherlands. So at present, it would seem that the diversity in medal winning nations does not stretch across the whole sport, the team event still tending to remain the preserve of the sports traditional powers.

During Grandi's tenure, the sport has gone through many controversies, notably those at the 2004 Olympics. The men's high bar fiasco surrounding Alexei Nemov and the Paul Hamm / Yang Tae Young dispute garnered the most publicity. In 2004–2005, the FIG and its president Grandi developed a new scoring system, in which an open-ended scoring will be used, so that the marks are theoretically limitless, therefore eliminating the notion of Perfect 10. The majority of the FIG did vote in favour of the new Code. This was a controversial move: many fans and athletes alike campaigned against it, speaking out in opposition.   The new code took effect in 2006.

In 2001 Grandi was inducted into the International Gymnastics Hall of Fame.

He died in Italy after an illness at age 85.

References

1934 births
2019 deaths
Italian male artistic gymnasts
People from Forlì
International Olympic Committee members
Presidents of the Fédération Internationale de Gymnastique
Gymnastic judges
Sportspeople from the Province of Forlì-Cesena